The men's middleweight (75 kg/165 lb) Low-Kick division at the W.A.K.O. European Championships 2006 in Skopje was the fifth heaviest of the male Low-Kick tournaments involving fifteen fighters.  Each of the matches was three rounds of two minutes each and were fought under Low-Kick kickboxing rules.

As there were too few fighters for a tournament designed for sixteen, one of the participants received a bye into the quarter finals.  The tournament gold medal was won by Russian Ibragim Tamazaev  who defeated Serbian Dragan Mićić in the final by unanimous decision.  It was Tamazaev's second gold at W.A.K.O. in Low-Kick as he was the defending world champion from Agadir 2005.  Defeated semi finalists Leszek Koltun from Poland and Stelian Angelov from Bulgaria won bronze medals.

Results

Key

See also
List of WAKO Amateur European Championships
List of WAKO Amateur World Championships
List of male kickboxers

References

External links
 WAKO World Association of Kickboxing Organizations Official Site

W.A.K.O. European Championships 2006 (Skopje)